Dragoljub Bekvalac (born 14 July 1952) is a Serbian retired footballer and current coach.

Playing career
Bekvalac spent most of his playing years with Novi Sad in the Yugoslav Second League. He also represented Vojvodina, making his Yugoslav First League debut in the early 1980s.

Coaching career
Bekvalac was manager of numerous clubs in his homeland and abroad, most notably Vojvodina and OFK Beograd. He also worked professionally in Bulgaria and Hungary.

Personal life
He is the father of singer Nataša Bekvalac.

References

External links
 

Association football defenders
Expatriate football managers in Bulgaria
Expatriate football managers in Hungary
FK TSC Bačka Topola players
FK Hajduk Kula managers
FK Novi Pazar managers
RFK Novi Sad 1921 players
FK Obilić managers
FK Rabotnički managers
FK Radnički 1923 managers
FK Radnički Niš managers
FK Sutjeska Nikšić managers
FK Teteks players
FK Vojvodina managers
FK Vojvodina players
FK Zemun managers
Győri ETO FC managers
Kosovo Serbs
OFK Beograd managers
PFC Beroe Stara Zagora managers
PFC Litex Lovech managers
Serbia and Montenegro expatriates in Bulgaria
Serbian expatriate sportspeople in Hungary
Serbian football managers
Serbian SuperLiga managers
Sportspeople from Pristina
Yugoslav First League players
Yugoslav footballers
1952 births
Living people